Phaenocora is a genus of flatworms belonging to the family Typhloplanidae.

The genus has almost cosmopolitan distribution.

Species:
 Phaenocora achaeorum Nasonov, 1919 
 Phaenocora acheorum Nasonov, 1919

References

Platyhelminthes